Save Each Other, the Whales Are Doing Fine is the debut studio album by American rock band Patent Pending. The original name of the CD was Save The Children, The Whales Are Doing Fine, but it was changed due to a threat to sue by the Save the Children Foundation. The title reflects the environmental concept of save the whales. Because the band didn't have the budget to fight their case in court, they were forced to change the name. Because of the changing of the name, and a few other minor legal and technical issues, the CD/DVD was pushed back one month. It came out on June 6, instead of May 9.

The CD was released with a bonus DVD which was filmed on January 13, 2006 at Alley Katz in Richmond, Virginia with some portions filmed on February 24, 2006 at Calvary Lutheran Church in East Meadow, New York.

Song changes
Some song names were changed from their previous state when they were put on this CD.
This Can't Happen Again was originally called Robert Ragosta Is a Sellout.
The L-Town Shakedown was originally called Levittown Is For Lovers.
Lights Out In Mississippi was originally called Vegas Baby, Vegas.
Mississippi Reprise was originally called Vegas Reprise.

Album credits
Michael Ragosta - Vocals
Joe Ragosta - Guitar, Vocals
Drew Buffardi - Bass
Anthony Mingoia - Drums
Brad Blackwood - Mastering 
Joshua Dicker - Vocals, Guitar, Songwriting
Joe Pedulla - Mastering, Production 
Justin Borucki - Photography  
Melissa Cross - Vocal Coach  
Andrew Everding - Percussion, Vocals  
Erin Farley - Bass, Guitar, Vocals, Engineer, Production Assistant  
Benny Horowitz - Vocals  
Joe Pedulla - Engineer  
Robert Ragosta - Vocals, Guitar
Tucker Rule - Percussion, Vocals  
John Fell Ryan - Sax (Tenor/Baritone)
Jon Degen - Sax (Tenor)
Nick Fox - Trombone (Tenor) 
Kyle Evan Zwyer - Trumpet
Dan 1- Trombone (Tenor)
Jeremy Stein (Guitar)

Track listing
Los Angeles  – 3:29
This Can't Happen Again  – 2:50
Decemberween  – 4:28
Lights Out In Mississippi  – 2:34
Demo for Dayna  – 4:24
Cheer Up Emo Kid  – 2:51
Old And Out of Tune  – 3:03
Samantha the Great  – 3:43
Sleep Well My Angel  – 2:43
The Safety of Sleeping In  – 2:47
The L-Town Shakedown  – 3:43
The June Spirit  – 3:32 
Bonus Tracks:
30 Seconds of Silence (Bonus Track)  – 0:31
Mississippi Reprise (Bonus Track)  – 0:40
Robert Ragosta Is a Ringtone (Bonus Track)  – 1:03

Trivia
The song title "Decemberween" is referring to a fictional holiday celebrated on www.homestarrunner.com
The bonus track "Robert Ragosta is a Ringtone" is a ringtone version of "This Can't Happen Again," without the lyrics.
The song "Cheer Up Emo Kid" is a new version, rerecorded without the saxophone.
During the band's legal battle with We Put Out Records, the album stopped being printed, causing the band to have no copies to sell on previous tours and currently. The record can still be purchased through certain retailers, and is available digitally.

References

2006 albums
Patent Pending (band) albums